The 1992–93 Sporting de Gijón season was the 31st season of the club in La Liga, the 17th consecutive after its last promotion.

Overview
Bert Jacobs resigned after the round 29. Carlos García Cuervo replaced him until the end of the season.

Squad

Competitions

La Liga

Results by round

League table

Matches

Copa del Rey

Matches

Squad statistics

Appearances and goals

|}

References

External links
Profile at BDFutbol
Official website

Sporting de Gijón seasons
Sporting de Gijon